Borinqueña is the debut studio album by Puerto Rican Actress Roselyn Sánchez. The first single from the album entitled Amor Amor was nominated for a Latin Grammy for Best Music Video.

Track listing
 "I Wanna Feel Your Rumba" (ft. Tyrese) - 4:02
 "Amor Amor" (ft. Tego Calderón) - 4:41
 "Mito" - 4:46
 "Suavecito" - 3:17
 "Noche De Verano" (ft. Víctor Manuelle) - 4:08
 "Olas Y Arenas" - 3:45
 "Caricias" - 4:24
 "Es Por Ti" - 4:29
 "Amante Mio" - 3:52
 "Lloro" - 3:23
 "El Camino" - 4:46
 "Amor Amor" (Salsa version) + ["Amor Amor" Hidden Dance Version]

Notes

Roselyn Sánchez albums by
2003 debut albums